The Filmfare Best Comedian Award was given by Filmfare as part of its annual Filmfare Awards for Hindi films, to recognise an actor who had delivered an outstanding performance in a comic role.

Although the awards started in 1954, awards for the best comedian category started only in 1967, and has not been awarded since 2007.

Superlatives

Anupam Kher, with 5 awards, has most wins than any other actor, followed by Mehmood with 4, and Deven Verma and Utpal Dutt with 3 awards each. Having won the award thrice in a row (1992–1994), Kher also holds the record for most consecutive wins in this category.

Mehmood, with 19 nominations, holds the record for the highest number of nominations in this category. Mehmood also holds the record for maximum nominations in a single year, having received 3 out of the 5 nominations of this category in 1975 (and eventually winning for Vardaan).

Multiple nominations

List of winners

1960s
1967 Mehmood – Pyar Kiye Jaa
Mehmood – Love in Tokyo
Om Prakash – Pyar Kiye Jaa
1968 Om Prakash – Dus Lakh
Johnny Walker – Pati Patni
Mehmood – Mehrban
1969 Johnny Walker – Shikar
Mehmood – Neel Kamal
Mehmood – Sadhu Aur Shaitaan

1970s
1970 Mehmood – Waris
Johnny Walker – Haseena Maan Jayegi
Mehmood – Meri Bhabhi
1971 I. S. Johar – Johny Mera Naam
Jagdeep – Khilona
Mehmood – Humjoli
1972 Mehmood – Paras
Jagdeep – Ek Nari Ek Brahmachari
Mehmood – Main Sunder Hoon
1973 Paintal – Bawarchi
Jagdeep – Bhai Ho To Aisa
Mehmood – Bombay to Goa
1974 Asrani – Aaj Ki Taaza Khabar
Asrani – Namak Haraam
I. S. Johar – Aaj Ki Taaza Khabar
Mehmood – Do Phool
Pran – Victoria No. 203
1975 Mehmood – Vardaan
Asrani – Bidaai
Asrani – Chor Machaye Shor
Mehmood – Duniya Ka Mela
Mehmood – Kunwara Baap
1976 Deven Verma – Chori Mera Kaam
Asrani – Rafoo Chakkar
Asrani – Sholay
Keshto Mukherjee – Kala Sona
Mehmood – Qaid
1977 Asrani – Balika Badhu
Asrani – Chhoti Si Baat
Deven Verma – Arjun Pandit
Deven Verma – Ek Se Badhkar Ek
Mehmood – Sabse Bada Rupaiya
1978 Paintal – Chala Murari Hero Banne
Deven Verma – Doosra Aadmi
Keshto Mukherjee – Chacha Bhatija
Manik Dutt – Safed Jhoot
Mukri – Tyaag
1979 Deven Verma – Chor Ke Ghar Chor
Asrani – Pati Patni Aur Woh
Deven Verma – Khatta Meetha
Keshto Mukherjee – Azaad
Ram Sethi – Muqaddar Ka Sikandar

1980s
1980 Utpal Dutt – Gol Maal
Asrani – Sargam
Deven Verma – Gol Maal
Deven Verma – Lok Parlok
Mehmood – Nauker
1981 Keshto Mukherjee – Khubsoorat
Asrani – Hum Nahin Sudherenge
Deven Verma – Judaai
Deven Verma – Thodisi Bewafaii
Keshto Mukherjee – Be-Reham
1982 Utpal Dutt – Naram Garam
Anoop Kumar – Chalti Ka Naam Zindagi
Asrani – Ek Duuje Ke Liye
Rakesh Bedi – Chashme Buddoor
Ravi Baswani – Chashme Buddoor
1983 Deven Verma – Angoor
Ashok Kumar – Shaukeen
Jagdeep – Ghazab
Mehmood – Khud-Daar
Utpal Dutt – Shaukeen
1984 Utpal Dutt – Rang Birangi
Deven Verma – Rang Birangi
Dharmendra – Naukar Biwi Ka
Kader Khan – Himmatwala
Shakti Kapoor – Mawaali
1985 Ravi Baswani – Jaane Bhi Do Yaaro
Dada Kondke – Tere Mere Beech Mein
Ravi Baswani – Ab Ayega Mazaa
Satish Shah – Jaane Bhi Do Yaaro
Shakti Kapoor – Tohfa
1986 Amjad Khan – Maa Kasam
Amjad Khan – Utsav
Annu Kapoor – Utsav
Deven Verma – Saaheb
Kader Khan – Aaj Ka Daur
1987 – No award
1988 – No award
1989 – No award in this category

1990s

1990 Anupam Kher and Satish Kaushik – Ram Lakhan (tie)
Kader Khan – Sikka
Laxmikant Berde – Maine Pyar Kiya
1991 Kader Khan – Baap Numbri Beta Dus Numbri
1992 Anupam Kher – Lamhe
Anupam Kher – Dil Hai Ki Manta Nahin
Kader Khan – Hum
Laxmikant Berde – 100 Days
1993 Anupam Kher – Khel
Anupam Kher – Shola Aur Shabnam
Laxmikant Berde – Beta
1994 Anupam Kher – Darr
Anupam Kher – Shreemaan Aashique
Johnny Lever – Baazigar
Kader Khan – Aankhen
1995 Shakti Kapoor – Raja Babu
Kader Khan – Main Khiladi Tu Anari
Laxmikant Berde – Hum Aapke Hain Koun..!
Shakti Kapoor – Andaz Apna Apna
Paresh Rawal – Mohra
1996 Anupam Kher – Dilwale Dulhania Le Jayenge
Ashok Saraf – Karan Arjun
Johnny Lever – Karan Arjun
Kader Khan – Coolie No. 1
1997 Satish Kaushik – Saajan Chale Sasural
Johnny Lever – Raja Hindustani
Kader Khan – Saajan Chale Sasural
Navneet Nishan – Raja Hindustani
Shakti Kapoor – Loafer
1998 Johnny Lever – Deewana Mastana
Johnny Lever – Judaai
Om Puri – Chachi 420
Paresh Rawal – Chachi 420
Shakti Kapoor – Judwaa
1999 Johnny Lever – Dulhe Raja
Anupam Kher – Kuch Kuch Hota Hai
Archana Puran Singh – Kuch Kuch Hota Hai
Johnny Lever – Kuch Kuch Hota Hai
Kader Khan – Dulhe Raja

2000s

2000 Govinda – Haseena Maan Jaayegi
Anil Kapoor – Biwi No.1
Johnny Lever – Anari No.1
Salman Khan – Biwi No.1
Shah Rukh Khan – Baadshah
2001 Paresh Rawal – Hera Pheri
Anupam Kher – Dulhan Hum Le Jayenge
Govinda – Kunwara
Johnny Lever – Kunwara
Johnny Lever – Phir Bhi Dil Hai Hindustani
2002 Saif Ali Khan – Dil Chahta Hai
Govinda – Jodi No.1
Govinda – Kyo Kii... Main Jhuth Nahin Bolta
Johnny Lever – Ajnabee
Paresh Rawal – Yeh Teraa Ghar Yeh Meraa Ghar
2003 Paresh Rawal – Awara Paagal Deewana
Govinda – Akhiyon Se Goli Maare
Johnny Lever – Humraaz
Mahesh Manjrekar – Kaante
Paresh Rawal – Aankhen
2004 Sanjay Dutt – Munna Bhai M.B.B.S.
Boman Irani – Munna Bhai M.B.B.S.
Johnny Lever – Koi... Mil Gaya
Paresh Rawal – Fun2shh...
Paresh Rawal – Hungama
2005 Saif Ali Khan – Hum Tum
Akshay Kumar – Mujhse Shaadi Karogi
Arshad Warsi – Hulchul
Boman Irani – Main Hoon Na
Paresh Rawal – Hulchul
2006 Akshay Kumar – Garam Masala
Anil Kapoor – No Entry
Javed Jaffrey – Salaam Namaste
Rajpal Yadav – Waqt: The Race Against Time
Salman Khan – No Entry
2007 Arshad Warsi – Lage Raho Munna Bhai
Chunky Pandey – Apna Sapna Money Money
Paresh Rawal – Phir Hera Pheri
Sharman Joshi – Golmaal
Tusshar Kapoor – Golmaal

See also

Filmfare Awards
Bollywood
Cinema of India

Comedian